Olsky District is an administrative and municipal district (raion), one of the eight in Magadan Oblast, Russia. It is located in the south of the oblast, consists of two unconnected mainland parts separated by the territories of Khasynsky District and the town of oblast significance of Magadan, and also has jurisdiction over several islands. Its administrative center is the urban locality (an urban-type settlement) of Ola. As of the 2010 Census, the total population of the district was 10,496, with the population of Ola accounting for 59.2% of that number.

Geography
The Ola, the Arman (with the Khasyn) and the Yama cross the district from north to south and the Buyunda has its sources in the district. The Olsky Plateau and the Maymandzhin Range are located in the district.

References

Notes

Sources

Districts of Magadan Oblast